Lythrodontas is a village located in the Nicosia District of Cyprus. It is 31 kilometres outside Nicosia.
Lythrodontas is built on the foothill of the mountain region of Machairas and is covered by the green colour of the olive groves.

Gallery

References

Communities in Nicosia District